South Australian Railways (SAR) was the statutory corporation through which the Government of South Australia built and operated railways in South Australia from 1854 until March 1978, when its non-urban railways were incorporated into Australian National, and its Adelaide urban lines were transferred to the State Transport Authority.

The SAR had three major rail gauges: 1600 mm (5 ft 3 in); 1435 mm (4 ft  in); and 1067 mm (3 ft 6 in).

History

Colonial period
The first railway in South Australia was laid in 1854 between Goolwa and Port Elliot to allow for goods to be transferred between paddle steamers on the Murray River and seagoing vessels. The next railway was laid from the harbour at Port Adelaide, to the capital, Adelaide, and was laid with Irish gauge  track. This line was opened in 1856. Later on, branch lines in the state's north in the mining towns of Kapunda and Burra were linked through to the Adelaide metropolitan system. From here, a south main line extended to meet the horse tramway from Victor Harbor to Strathalbyn, and towards the South Australia/Victoria Border.

With the metropolitan systems being broad gauge, the mid north and south east of the state were originally laid with  narrow gauge track. These systems were closely based on British practice, as was the broad gauge system prior to 1926. Locomotives and rolling stock were bought from the United Kingdom and United States, from builders such as Beyer, Peacock & Company, Dübs and Company, North British Locomotive Company, and Baldwin Locomotive Works. Nine broad gauge tank locomotives plus the frame of a tenth were bought second-hand from the Canterbury Provincial Railways in New Zealand when it converted to narrow gauge.

Rehabilitation

In 1922, after the SAR's worst financial deficit, the government appointed American railroad manager William Webb, from the Missouri-Kansas-Texas Railroad as Chief Commissioner. When Webb arrived in Adelaide with his young family, he found a railway system unchanged since the late 19th century. The locomotives and rolling stock were small, wagons and carriages were of wooden construction, the track and bridges were unsuitable for heavy loads, the workshops had antiquated machinery and the signalling system was inflexible. These attributes drove up the ratio of operating costs to revenue.

Webb introduced a rehabilitation plan based on American railroad principles of large, standardised locomotives and steel bodied freight wagons, with automatic couplers to enable a significant increase in productivity. Lightly patronised passenger trains would be replaced by self-propelled rail cars, enabling faster, more frequent and more efficient services. He recruited Fred Shea as his Chief Mechanical Engineer and had him prepare specifications for this new equipment. This resulted in orders being placed for 1,200 wagons of four types from American Car and Foundry, 12 petrol mechanical railmotor cars from the Service Motors Corporation, Wabash, Indiana, and 30 locomotives based on American Locomotive Company plans but built by Armstrong Whitworth & Co in the United Kingdom. These were of the Mountain, Pacific and Mikado wheel arrangements, 10 of each type, which became the 500, 600, and 700 class locomotives.

To carry the heavier trains, the rehabilitation plan included the strengthening of track and bridges, and the conversion of the mid north  narrow gauge system (the Western division) to  broad gauge. The antiquated Islington Railway Workshops were demolished and replaced with a thoroughly modern railway maintenance and manufacturing works, a large new round house was built at Mile End, near Adelaide, and several 85 foot turntables were installed throughout the state to enable the much larger locomotives to be turned. Efficient train operations were facilitated by the adoption of American train order working on country lines, and Adelaide railway station was replaced with an imposing new building, opened in 1927. This grand building has been partially taken over by the Adelaide Casino.

When the two shiploads of new locomotives arrived in 1926 they caused a sensation with the public and throughout the railway industry in Australia. The 500 class "Mountain" was over twice the size of the biggest pre-Webb engine, and was the most powerful locomotive in Australia. Henceforth double heading  broad gauge trains became a rarity in South Australia. The massive locomotives were unloaded at Port Adelaide and taken off the pier by horses (the locomotives weight alone exceeding the dock's maximum loading capacity). Apart from some initial teething problems (mainly to do with overheating bearings and rough riding due to excessive play allowed on driving axles) the new locomotives settled in nicely to their assigned positions. After the success of the original locomotives, ten more 700 class locomotives, with larger tenders, were locally built using the facilities of the new Islington Workshops. These were the 710 class.

The 500 class was rated to haul 400 tons over the Mount Lofty Ranges immediately east of Adelaide, where a  continuous 1-in-45 (2.2%) gradient faced trains heading for Victoria. Two years after their introduction, the class was modified by the addition of a booster engine which required replacement of the two-wheel trailing truck with a four-wheel truck. This altered the wheel arrangement from 4-8-2 to 4-8-4, but the term "Mountains" stuck with the locomotives. Reclassified 500B class, their maximum load to Mount Lofty was increased to 600 tons, or eleven passenger cars. In the pre-Webb era the Rx class - a 4-6-0 with a Belpaire firebox was rated at 190 tons for this line, with three of them required to lift a heavy Melbourne Express - two at the front and one banking from the rear.

The  broad gauge system was the main focus of Webb rehabilitation scheme. The  narrow gauge systems north of Terowie and on the Eyre Peninsula remained untouched, as did the  gauge South Eastern division (although it was subsequently converted to  broad gauge in the early 1950s).

Webb decided not to extend his contract in 1930 and returned to the US, having revolutionised the SAR.

Post-Depression period

In 1936, the SAR owned 365 locomotives, 51 railcars, 408 passenger carriages, 38 brake vans and 8,219 goods wagons. The following year, ten 620 class 4-6-2 Pacific type locomotives, designed and built at the SAR's Islington Works – were introduced. Their axle load enabled them to traverse the many rural lines laid with 60-pound rail, but they were also usefully deployed on the East-West Express between Adelaide and Port Pirie following the extension of the broad gauge line north from Redhill to Port Pirie in 1937.

Other additions to the locomotive fleet after the Depression included the 2-8-4 720 class, a further development of the 700/710 class locomotives, and the 520 class, a 4-8-4 locomotive, externally styled after the Pennsylvania Railroad T1; it had the same light axle load as the 620 class but a 30% higher tractive effort, achieving higher speeds on all mainline passenger services.

In 1949, the diesel era started, tentatively, with two Bo-Bo 350 class shunting locomotives, designed and built by Islington Works and incorporating British components.

Two years later, the SAR's first mainline diesel-electric locomotives entered service: the 900 class, also designed and built by Islington Railway Workshops. Their styling closely followed that of the Alco PA diesels in the United States. Subsequently, and coincidentally, the SAR exclusively purchased American Locomotive Company products made under licence in Sydney by AE Goodwin: the 930, 830, 600 and 700 classes. In the 1950s, railcars were introduced: the 250 and 100 class "Bluebirds" for regional services and the 300 and 400 class "Red Hens" for Adelaide suburban services. 

A major change occurred in 1970, when the remaining  length of the Sydney-Perth rail corridor that was not built to  standard gauge, the Port Pirie-Broken Hill line, was gauge-converted.

In the 1972 election, the Whitlam Federal Government made a commitment to invite the states to hand over their railway systems to the federal government. The Government of South Australia took up the offer, but elected to retain the Adelaide metropolitan services, which were transferred to the State Transport Authority. Financial responsibility for the remaining services passed to the Federal Government on 1 July 1975, although the SAR continued services until operations were formally transferred on 1 March 1978 to the Australian National Railways Commission.

The penultimate head of the SAR, commissioner Ron Fitch, reflecting on the end of the railway administration, wrote: "The merging of the major part of the SAR into the Australian National Railways Commission, and the remainder into the South Australian State Transport Authority, cannot but tend to consign the former state railway system into eventual oblivion. But posterity should not be allowed to forget its achievements:
 The Goolwa to Port Elliot railway, the first public railway in Australia.
 The first publicly owned railway in the British Empire; that between Adelaide and Port Adelaide.
 The Darwin to Pine Creek and the Port Augusta to Oodnadatta railways, built ... as part of the grand concept of a north-south transcontinental rail link. 
 Its gesture, together with the gentlemen of the Silverton Tramway Company, in providing a rail connection to Broken Hill, at a time when NSW declined to do so. 
 The introduction into the Australian railways in the 1920s of large steam locomotive power.
 The installation of the nation's first train control system. 
 The design and construction of what were then the world's finest sleeping cars.
 The placing into scheduled service on the mainland of Australia the first mainline diesel-electric locomotive."

Locomotive and railcar classes
{|cellpadding="2"
|

{|cellpadding="2"
|

{|cellpadding="2"
|

Commissioners

Board of Commissioners 1888–1895:
J. H. Smith 
A. S. Neill 
John Hill.
Alan G. Pendleton 1895–1909
Alexander B. Moncrieff 1909–1916
James McGuire 1916–1922
William Alfred Webb 1922–1930
Charles Buxton Anderson 1930–1946
Robert Hall Chapman  1946–1953
John Adrian Fargher 1953–1965
Ron Fitch 1965–1973
Murray L. Stockley 1973–1975

Publications
In June 1965, Rail News was launched as a quarterly staff newsletter. It was published monthly from January 1970. The last edition was published in March 1973, with Keeping Track superseding it the next month.

See also

Holdfast Bay railway line
Bob the Railway Dog
SteamRanger Heritage Railway
Steamtown Heritage Rail Centre

References

External links
Details of Broad Gauge locomotives
Details of Narrow Gauge locomotives

Former government railways of Australia
History of transport in South Australia
Rail transport in South Australia
Railway companies established in 1854
Railway companies disestablished in 1978
1854 establishments in Australia
1978 disestablishments in Australia